Colorado's 23rd Senate district is one of 35 districts in the Colorado Senate. It has been represented by Republican Barbara Kirkmeyer since 2021.

Geography
District 23 covers the City of Broomfield and parts of Larimer and Weld Counties on the outskirts of Fort Collins and Greeley. Communities in the district other than Broomfield include Timnath, Windsor, Mead, Severance, Firestone, Frederick, Dacono, and parts of Berthoud, Johnstown, and Erie.

The district is split between Colorado's 2nd and 4th congressional districts, and overlaps with the 33rd, 48th, 49th, 52nd, and 63rd districts of the Colorado House of Representatives.

Recent election results
Colorado state senators are elected to staggered four-year terms; under normal circumstances, the 23rd district holds elections in presidential years.

2020

2016

2012

Federal and statewide results in District 23

References 

23
Broomfield, Colorado
Larimer County, Colorado
Weld County, Colorado